Kafr Takharim (also spelled Kafar Takhareem or Kfar Takharam) is a town in northwestern Syria, administratively part of the Idlib Governorate, located in the north of Idlib. Nearby localities include Harem to the north, Salqin to the northwest, Abu Talha to the west and Armanaz to the south. According to the Syria Central Bureau of Statistics, Kafr Takharim had a population of 10,084 in the 2004 census. The town is also the administrative center of the Kafr Takharim nahiyah which consists of nine villages with a combined population of 14,772. Its inhabitants are predominantly Sunni Muslims.

History 
Ibrahim Hananu, the Syrian nationalist who led the anti-French resistance in the Aleppo region in 1919, was born in Kafr Takharim. The town, which Hananu had represented in the Syrian National Congress, would serve as a base for his revolt. In 1958 Kafr Takharim's municipal council was replaced by a government-appointed municipal committee.

Kafr Takharim has seen anti-government demonstrations and has experienced violence many times during the ongoing Syrian uprising against the government of Bashar al-Assad. On 1 August 2011 opposition activists from the Local Coordination Committees of Syria reported that over 175 people in the town were arrested and publicly beaten before being sent to the prisons of various security branches during house raids carried out by security forces and pro-government militia. On 1 October 2012, three rebels were reportedly killed in Kafr Takharim during armed clashes with the Syrian Army.

On 26 October 2020, Russian warplanes targeted a training camp of Faylaq al-Sham, a Turkish-backed rebel group, near Kafr Takharim. The strike killed at least 78 fighters and wounded more than 100. The head of the Syrian Observatory for Human Rights called the strike the heaviest attack since the beginning of the ceasefire.

References

Bibliography 

Populated places in Harem District
Towns in Syria